The St. Martin's Church (German: St. Martini) is a Protestant Lutheran and Reformed church in the old town of Bremen. It is located near the Weser river and is one of the oldest churches in the city.

History
The church was founded in 1229. The late-Gothic brick building suffered severe damage in 1944 and was rebuilt after the war. In 1973, the church was listed under the monument protection act.

References

Churches in Bremen (city)
Protestant churches in Bremen (state)
Lutheran churches in Germany